Micromus posticus is a species of brown lacewing in the family Hemerobiidae. It is found in the Caribbean, Central America, and North America.

References

 Bugguide.net. Species Micromus posticus

Further reading

 

Hemerobiiformia
Insects described in 1853